Claudia Rosiny (born February 15, 1960, in Bad Godesberg) is a German-Swiss academic in Dance and Media studies, a festival director and cultural manager. She became internationally known as an expert on video dance. Having served as a co-director of the Berne Dance Days for many years, she is in charge of the Performing Arts at the Federal Office of Culture Berne and teaches at the Lucerne University of Applied Sciences and Arts.

Biography
Claudia Rosiny grew up the eldest of six siblings in the Herler Mühle, an old water mill in Cologne-Buchheim. Her father, Nikolaus Rosiny (born July 19, 1926, in Mülheim an der Ruhr, Germany, died March 16, 2011, in Cologne) was an architect, her mother Johanna Rosiny née Riedel (born June 4, 1936, in Prague), a psychotherapist for children and adolescents. After completing her training as a gymnastics teacher, Rosiny studied Theatre, Film and Television, German and Education at the University of Cologne (1983–1989). For three semesters, she also attended the Play-Music-Dance (Spiel-Musik-Tanz) course as a guest student at the German Sport University Cologne (Deutsche Sporthochschule Köln). In 1987/88 she did one semester of Theatre Studies at the University of Amsterdam. In 1997, she did a PhD with her dissertation being on Video Dance at the Institute of Theatre Studies at the University of Berne.

Since her studies Claudia Rosiny has devoted herself to her specialist fields of Video Dance and Intermediality in Dance: "Inter- and transdisciplinary cultural studies are needed in an art context of convergence, in which the disciplines come together, connect and enable new experiences of perception.(...) If time travel was possible, I would like to talk to the pioneers of film and dance, like Georges Méliès or Loïe Fuller, and ask them what, back then, fascinated them most in the interplay of movement of dance and film."

She is married to Reto Clavadetscher (born 1961), they have a daughter and live in Bern.

Awards
 2005 Cultural Prize Canton of Berne (Berne Dance Days) [Kulturpreis Kanton Bern (Berner Tanztage)]
 1992 Cultural Prize Municipality of Berne (Berne Dance Days) [Kulturpreis Burgergemeinde Bern (Berner Tanztage)]

Berne Dance Days
This festival of contemporary dance was established in 1987 by Reto Clavadetscher and co-directed by Claudia Rosiny from 1991 to 2007. Highlights of the Berne Dance Days include the themed festivals  Danseimage (1996, re. dance and film) and Kunststückkörper (1997, re. dance and diverse body forms, including disabilities), and guest performances by renowned dance artists such as Maguy Marin, Wim Vandekeybus, Sasha Waltz, Meg Stuart and many others. The Berne Dance Days are documented on several media platforms:

 Around 250 video recordings of performances and projects from the years 1988 to 2007 were digitised and handed over to the Swiss Dance Archive (Schweizer Tanzarchiv/Collection Suisse de la Danse, today SAPA Swiss Archive of the Performing Arts) at the Zurich branch. Thus these recordings of historic significance were preserved and made available to interested members of the public.
 An extensive collection of documents on the companies that performed at the Berne Dance Days, a complete set of posters and programmes as well as other relevant documents were handed over to the Swiss Dance Archive (Schweizer Tanzarchiv/Collection Suisse de la Danse, today SAPA Swiss Archive of the Performing Arts) at the Lausanne branch for research purposes.
 In 2007, Rosiny, together with Reto Clavadetscher, published Contemporary Dance. Bodies, Concepts, Cultures – a Survey (Zeitgenössischer Tanz. Körper, Konzepte, Kulturen – eine Bestandsaufnahme). The book was published on the occasion of the 20th anniversary and final staging of the Berne Dance Days, in the meantime can be downloaded for free on the publisher’s website and is the first to be dedicated to contemporary dance in the German-speaking world.

Kornhausforum Bern
Since its foundation in 1998, the Kornhausforumhas been a venue for design and social politics. The concept for its occupancy, demonstrating a pronounced bias towards culture, was determined via a referendum of the Bernese people. Over ten years (1998–2007) – first as a co-director (with Peter Eichenberger), then, from 2006 onwards, solely in charge – Claudia Rosiny steered its development as a cultural centre focusing on architecture, design, photography, video, new media and socio-political issues. In addition to around 300 events per year, more than 100 exhibitions were held during this time, including:
 Playfulness & Clarity. Swiss Architecture, Graphic Arts and Design 1950–2006  (Spielwitz & Klarheit. Schweizer Architektur, Grafik und Design 1950–2006), 2006
 Sex Work. An Exhibition on Prostitution (Sexarbeit. Eine Ausstellung zum Thema Prostitution), 2007

Swiss Dance Archive
From 2009 to 2012, Rosiny worked as a specialist consultant on modern dance for the Swiss Dance Archive in Zurich, where she co-ordinated lecture programmes, acquired, amongst others, the Nachlass (estate) of Sigurd Leeder in 2011, oversaw a video project on early contemporary dance in Western Switzerland and, until the end of 2010, project-managed the fusion of the Archives suisses de la danse in Lausanne with the mediathektanz.ch in Zurich into the Swiss Dance Archive (Schweizer Tanzarchiv/Collection suisse de la danse) with branches in Zürich and Lausanne. It has existed in this new form since January 1, 2011. In 2018, it was merged with the Swiss Theatre Collection to form the SAPA – Swiss Archive of the Performing Arts.

Teaching in higher education
As a lecturer, Rosiny is strongly committed to integrating dance practice, dance studies and film. From 1994 to 2005, she led seminars on Video Dance and Contemporary Dance at the Institute for Theatre Studies at the University of Berne, and from 2006 to 2011 proseminars on intermediality, postmodernism, dance, theatre and performance at the Institute for Media Studies at the University of Basel. From 2002 to 2015, she was a member of the programme management team and a lecturer on the continuing education course TanzKultur (designed for students in employment) at the University of Bern. Since 2016, she has been working there in the same capacity at the Institute for Theatre Studies on the newly introduced Master of Advanced Studies in Dance/Performing Arts course: "This unique Continuing Education Study Programme, with its interdisciplinary design and international network, will reflect the current state of research." She has been teaching Cultural Management Practice (continuing education) at Lucerne University since 2012.

Dance film programming
Rosiny curated, academically contextualised and evaluated numerous dance film programmes:
 1990 Dance films for the 34th International Summer Academy of Dance Cologne (34. Internationale Sommerakademie des Tanzes Köln)
 1993–1997 Dance films Kellerkino Bern
 1993 Video programming, Gulbenkian Foundation Lisbon
 1994 Dance Screen Club Dada at the Styrian Autumn Graz
 2000 Selection panel member, Dance for the Camera 6  for the BBC and Arts Council London
 2003 Moving Dance Images, Dance Film Festival Kino Xenix MGB Zurich
 2012 Women in Dance for the Migros Co-operative Federation
 Zurich as part of the Steps Dance Festival

Jury and board memberships
Rosiny was on the jury panel of the Hans-Reinhart-Ring of the Swiss Society for Theatre Culture (Schweizerische Gesellschaft für Theaterkultur SGTK) from 2001 to 2006, of the German Video Dance Prize 2003–2004, the Swiss Dance and Choreography Prize 2002–2010  and the Dance Screen competition in Cologne (1999). She also participated in the pre-selection for the 37th Dance on Camera Festival New York City (2008/9) and VIPER '01, the International Film & Videofestival Basel (2001).

From 1995 to 2005, she advised the Migros Cooperative Aare on dance funding and promotion, from 1993 to 2010 she was a board member of the Archives suisses de la danse, Lausanne, and from 1997 to 2003 President of the Commission for Theater and Dance, Canton of Berne. Since 2009, she has been a board member of Teatro San Materno, Ascona.

Federal Office of Culture Berne
Since 2012, Claudia Rosiny has been in charge of 
Dance and Theatre, since 2021 for the Performing Arts at the Federal Office of Culture Berne in the Department for Cultural Creation and has been developing the new national awards policy of the federal government for these areas, with the aim of recognising the quality of professional artistic dance and theatre practice in all its diversity and strengthening it on a national level.

Swiss Dance Awards
The Federal Office of Culture has been awarding the Swiss Grand Award for Dance (CHF 40,000) from 2013 until 2019 every two years, as well as a Special Dance Award (CHF 40,000), two awards in the category Outstanding Female Dancer/Outstanding Male Dancer (CHF 25,000 each) and four Swiss Dance Awards (25,000 Francs each). In addition, the June Johnson Dance Prize in partnership with the Stanley Thomas Johnson Foundation (CHF 25,000). The Grand Award for Dance is awarded to honour a recipient's artistic career on the recommendation of the Swiss Federal Dance Jury. 

The first person to win this award was in 2013 the Swiss choreographer Martin Schläpfer, former artistic director of the Ballet am Rhein of the Deutsche Oper am Rhein Düsseldorf Duisburg. In 2015, the award went to the Geneva choreographer Gilles Jobin, in 2017 to Noemi Lapzeson, Geneva choreographer and founder of Vertical Danse, and 2019 to La Ribot, spanish-swiss choreographer and dancer.

Swiss Theater Awards

In the field of theatre, the Federal Office of Culture awarded the annual Swiss Grand Award for Theatre/Hans-Reinhart-Ring (CHF 100,000), a Swiss Cabaret (Kleinkunst) Prize and five Swiss Theatre Awards (CHF 40,000 each). In 2014, Omar Porras was the first recipient of the Swiss Grand Award Theatre, followed by Stefan Kaegi – Rimini Protokoll in 2015, the Zurich-based Theater HORA in 2016, Ursina Lardi in 2017, Theater Sgaramusch in 2018, Yan Duyvendak in 2019 and Jossi Wieler in 2020.

Swiss Performing Arts Awards 

In 2021, the Swiss Dance Awards and Swiss Theatre Awards were merged under the umbrella of the Performing Arts. The aim of this change is to bring the disciplines of dance, theatre, the various forms that make up other facets of the performing arts such as performance, comedy, contemporary circus, puppet theatre and street arts closer together, and increase the visibility of the performing arts. It will also allow the Hans Reinhart Ring to be presented once again in all areas of the performing arts, notably dance. All awards are listed and archived on the Swiss Cultural Awards.

Selected publications

Monographs
 Claudia Rosiny: Video Dance: Panorama of an Intermediate Art Form. (""). Theatrum helveticum, ed. V. ITW Bern, vol. 5, Chronos, Zurich 1999, 
 Margrit Bischof, Claudia Feest, Claudia Rosiny (eds.): e_motion, Series: Dance Research Almanach (Jahrbuch Tanzforschung), Vol. 16, Lit, Münster 2006, out of stock
 Claudia Rosiny and Reto Clavadetscher (Eds.): Contemporary Dance. Bodies, Concepts, Cultures – A Survey, (Zeitgenössischer Tanz. Körper, Konzepte, Kulturen – eine Bestandsaufnahme), Transcript, Bielefeld 2007, 
 Margrit Bischof, Claudia Rosiny (Eds.): Concepts of Dance Culture: Knowledge and Methods of Dance Research (Konzepte der Tanzkultur. Wissen und Wege der Tanzforschung), Transcript, Bielefeld 2010, 
 Hedy Graber, Dominik Landwehr, Veronika Sellier (eds.), Peter Haber and Claudia Rosiny (co-editors): Digital Culture. Terms, Backgrounds, Examples  (Kultur digital. Begriffe, Hintergründe, Beispiele), Merian, Basel 2011, 
 Claudia Rosiny: Dance Film. Intermedial Relations between Media History and Modern Dance Aesthetics (Tanz Film. Intermediale Beziehungen zwischen Mediengeschichte und moderner Tanzästhetik), Transcript, Bielefeld 2013,

Articles in encyclopediae
 Video Dance (Videotanz), In: Manfred Brauneck, Gérard Schneilin: Encyclopedia of Theatre (Theaterlexikon), 3rd New Edition, Reinbek 1992, pp. 1085–1086
 Encyclopedia articles on: Jean Deroc, Ricardo Duse, Susana Janssen. In: Historical Encyclopaedia of Switzerland (Historisches Lexikon der Schweiz (HLS)): Schwabe Basel, published 2002 onwards in 13 volumes.
 Articles on Dance: Deroc, Dietrich, Flamencos en route, Fritsche, Kreissig, Malfer, Mattis, Swiss Chamber Ballet (Schweizer Kammerballett), Steps, Susana, Video Dance (Videotanz), Zöllig. In: Andreas Kotte (Ed.): Encyclopedia of Theatre Switzerland (Theaterlexikon Schweiz), Chronos Zurich, 2005
 Change in Perception – From Dance Video to Video Dance (Wandel in der Wahrnehmung – Vom Tanzvideo zum Videotanz). In: Frieder Reininghaus & Katja Schneider (Eds.): Experimental Music and Dance Theatre. Compendium of Music in the 20th Century (Experimentelles Musik- und Tanztheater. Handbuch der Musik im 20. Jahrhundert), Volume 7, Laaber-Verlag Laaber, 2004, pp. 356–359. New edition Change in Perception – From Dance Video to Video Dance (Wandel in der Wahrnehmung – Vom Tanzvideo zum Videotanz). In: Siegfried Mauser, Elisabeth Schmierer (Eds.): Handbook of Musical Genres (Handbuch der musikalischen Gattungen), Volume 17,1: Community Music, Wind Music, Movement Music (Gesellschaftsmusik, Bläsermusik, Bewegungsmusik), Laaber-Verlag Laaber, 2009, pp. 299–301
 Lemmata Tanzfilm (Lemmata Tanzfilm), Video Dance (Videotanz), Motion Capturing, Amélia, Roseland, Lloyd Newson. In: Monika Woitas and Annette Hartmann (Eds.): Encyclopedia of Dance (Lexikon des Tanzes), Laaber-Verlag Laaber, 2013
 List of Publications Claudia Rosiny (1997–2016)

References

Further reading
 UIrich Völker: An Excellent Reference Book for Browsing (Excellentes Fachbuch zum Schmökern).
 Peter Dahms: Dance Film (Tanzfilm).
 Richard John Ascárate: In Focus: Dance Film (Im Blickpunkt: Tanz Film). In: MEDIENwissenschaft 04/2013, University of Marburg
 Kristina Köhler: Reviews of Claudia Rosiny Tanz Film (Rezensionen zu Claudia Rosiny Tanz Film). In: Kiel Contributions to Film Music Research (Kieler Beiträge zur Filmmusikforschung) 11/2014
 Helmut Dworschak: The trend towards documentary theatre continues (Der Trend zum dokumentarischen Theater hält an), Interview. In: Der Landbote, May 29, 2015

External links
 Federal Office of Culture, Department for Cultural Creation
 Swiss Cultural Awards
 SAPA Archive for the Performing Arts
 Berne Dance Days
 University of Berne

You Tube 
 Development of the art form Dance Video. How the Camera Gets Its Own Role in Dance (Entwicklung der Kunstform Tanzvideo. Wie die Kamera eine eigene Rolle bekommt). Contributor: Claudia Rosiny. Broadcast in 2001 on 3sat
 Presentation by Claudia Rosiny: Dance in Silent Movies and on Youtube. Analogue Attractions in the Digital Medium (Referat von Claudia Rosiny: Tanz im Stummfilm and auf Youtube. Analoge Attraktionen im Digitalen Medium)

Dance research
Dance in film
Academic staff of the University of Bern
People from Bern
1960 births
Living people
German expatriates in Switzerland